The fifth and final season of the American television series Warehouse 13 premiered on April 14, 2014 and ended on May 19, 2014 on Syfy. The season consists of six episodes. The show stars Eddie McClintock, Joanne Kelly, Saul Rubinek, Allison Scagliotti, and Aaron Ashmore.

Cast

Main
 Eddie McClintock as Pete Lattimer
 Joanne Kelly as Myka Bering
 Saul Rubinek as Artie Nielsen
 Allison Scagliotti as Claudia Donovan
 Aaron Ashmore as Steve Jinks

Special guest
 Anthony Stewart Head as Paracelsus

Recurring
 C. C. H. Pounder as Mrs. Irene Frederic
 Jaime Murray as Helena G. Wells
 Kelly Hu as Abigail Cho
 Chryssie Whitehead as Claire Donovan

Guest
 Rebecca Mader as Lisa da Vinci
 Lindsay Wagner as Vanessa Calder
 René Auberjonois as Hugo Miller
 Janet Varney as Elise
 Ryan Cartwright as Oswald
 Erin Way as Katarina
 Paula Garcés as Kelly Hernandez
 Sônia Braga as Alicia
 Mark A. Sheppard as Benedict Valda (Also has an uncredited role in "Endless Terror")
 Genelle Williams as Leena
 Samm Levine as Scott Moore
 Erick Avari as Catarunga
 Jack Kenny as Jack

Production
On May 16, 2013, it was announced that Warehouse 13 was renewed for a fifth and final season of six episodes to air in 2014. Filming in the Toronto area began on June 24, 2013, and concluded on August 31, 2013.

Episodes

DVD release

References

General references

External links

 
 

5
2014 American television seasons